Topaklı may refer to the following places in Turkey:

 Topaklı, Gölbaşı, a neighborhood of the district of Gölbaşı, Ankara Province
 Topaklı, Tarsus, a village in the district of Tarsus, Mersin Province